Teuchestes is a genus of scarab beetles in the family Scarabaeidae. There are about 10 described species in Teuchestes, found worldwide.

Species
These 10 species belong to the genus Teuchestes:
 Teuchestes analis (Fabricius, 1787)
 Teuchestes brachysomus (Solsky, 1874)
 Teuchestes caffer (Wiedemann, 1823)
 Teuchestes dejeani (Harold, 1862)
 Teuchestes fossor (Linnaeus, 1758)
 Teuchestes guangdong Rakovič & Mencl, 2012
 Teuchestes hongson Rakovič & Mencl, 2012
 Teuchestes sinofraternus (Dellacasa & Johnson, 1983)
 Teuchestes uenoi Ochi, Kawahara & Kon, 2006
 Teuchestes wicheri (Dellacasa & Johnson, 1983)

References

External links

 

Scarabaeidae
Scarabaeidae genera
Taxa named by Étienne Mulsant